Douglas Charles Jones (born May 31, 1950) is a former professional American football player who played safety for six seasons for the Kansas City Chiefs, Buffalo Bills, and the Detroit Lions in the National Football League (NFL).

References

1950 births
Living people
American football safeties
Arizona State Sun Devils football players
Cal State Northridge Matadors football players
Buffalo Bills players
Detroit Lions players
Kansas City Chiefs players
Players of American football from San Diego